Knefastia polygona is an extinct species of sea snail, a marine gastropod mollusk in the family Pseudomelatomidae, the turrids and allies.

Description
The length of the shell attains 20 mm.

Distribution
This extinct marine species was found in Eocene strata in the Paris basin, France.

References

 Deshayes, G. P., 1834–1835, Description des coquilles fossiles des environs de Paris, t. II, fasc. 5 et 6, in-4°, Paris, 1834–1835.
 Cossmann (M.) & Pissarro (G.), 1913 Iconographie complète des coquilles fossiles de l'Éocène des environs de Paris, t. 2, p. pp. 46–65
 Le Renard (J.) & Pacaud (J.-M.), 1995 Révision des Mollusques paléogènes du Bassin de Paris. 2 - Liste des références primaires des espèces. Cossmanniana, t. 3, vol. 3, pp. 65–132
  Caze (B.), Merle (D.), Saint Martin (J.-P.) & Pacaud (J.-M.), 2012 Les mollusques éocènes se dévoilent sous ultraviolets. Fossiles. Revue française de paléontologie, t. hors série n° 3, pp. 15–56

External links
 MNHN, Paris: Knefastia polygona

polygona
Gastropods described in 1834